The historic Cabarrus County Courthouse in Concord, North Carolina was completed in 1876, replacing one that was destroyed by fire just the previous year. It was designed by architect G.S.H. Appleget.  It includes Second Empire, Italianate, Classical Revival, and other architecture.  It was listed on the National Register of Historic Places in 1974. In 1975, a new courthouse was built; the historic courthouse is now the home of the Cabarrus County Veterans Museum and the Cabarrus Arts Council. It is located in the South Union Street Courthouse and Commercial Historic District.

Cabarrus County has constructed four courthouses since the creation of the county in 1792.  The records show that the first court held for the county of Cabarrus was at the house of Robert Russell located on the Salisbury Road on the third Monday of January, 1793.  In 1795 commissioners were named to build the first courthouse; it was very small, only thirty feet square, poorly lit and ventilated and inadequately heated.  It was built at the center of the square which was the intersection of Union and Corban Streets; this structure was used for thirty years until a new courthouse was constructed in 1826.

Civil War monument
A Confederate soldiers monument was dedicated May 5, 1892, by the Ladies' Memorial Association of Concord. Constructed of marble the eight sections weigh  twenty-five thousand pounds with a sphere on top. The monument was placed in front of the courthouse where it remains and each year the Confederate Memorial Day is observed with a history of adorning the 16 foot monument with flowers and flags.

References

County courthouses in North Carolina
Courthouses on the National Register of Historic Places in North Carolina
Italianate architecture in North Carolina
Second Empire architecture in North Carolina
Neoclassical architecture in North Carolina
Government buildings completed in 1875
Buildings and structures in Cabarrus County, North Carolina
National Register of Historic Places in Cabarrus County, North Carolina
Historic district contributing properties in North Carolina
1875 establishments in North Carolina